Alpraham is a village and civil parish in Cheshire, England, on the A51 road between Nantwich and Chester, seven miles north-west of Nantwich. The population is around 400.

The Travellers Rest public house is on the Campaign for Real Ale's National Inventory of Historic Pub Interiors. It was built in about 1850 and extended in 1937, and the interwar interior remains largely unchanged.

Demography
The 2001 Census gave the parish's population as 373, rising to 407 in 162 households in the 2011 Census. The population density was 0.6 persons/hectare in 2011, well below the average of 3.2 persons/hectare for Cheshire East.

History 
Alpraham was mentioned in the Domesday book as belonging to Edwin, Earl of Mercia in 1066 and belonging to Gilbert de Venables in 1086 when it had 3 villagers and 6 smallholders. It had 4 ploughlands, 1 men's plough team, 2 acres of meadow and 2 leagues of woodland. In 1086 the value of the manor was just 8 shillings whereas in 1066 it had been 1 pound.

See also

Listed buildings in Alpraham

References

External links 

 Alpraham Parish Council
 

Villages in Cheshire
Civil parishes in Cheshire